HMS Wild Swan was an  sloop built for the Royal Navy in the mid-1870s. She was launched in 1877 and became a base ship in 1904, being renamed Clyde. She was renamed Columbine in 1913 and was sold for breaking in 1920.

Design and construction

Wild Swan was an Osprey-class sloop-of-war, with a composite hull design. An R & W Hawthorn two-cylinder horizontal returning-rod steam engine fed by three cylindrical boilers provided  to the single  propeller screw. After the first commission the engine was replaced by a Devonport Dockyard two-cylinder horizontal compound-expansion steam engine. In addition to the steam-driven propeller, the vessel was also barque rigged. The standard ship's company was between 140 and 150.

Armament consisted of two 7-inch (90 cwt) muzzle-loading rifled guns, four 64-pounder guns, four machine guns, and one light gun. Wild Swan and her sister-ship  were re-armed later with two 6-inch (81 cwt) BL guns and six 5-inch (35 cwt) BL guns.

Wild Swan was built by Robert Napier and Sons, of Govan, Scotland. The vessel was laid down on 14 September 1874 as yard number 341. She was launched on 28 January 1876, and commissioned into the Royal Navy on 23 August 1876. Construction costs included £39,643 for the hull, and £11,853 for machinery and equipment.

Service history
Wild Swan patrolled off the coast of Mozambique in 1880, operating against the slave trade. In early 1881, she operated together with Portuguese forces against slavers, landing a Portuguese force at Conducia Bay on 12 February 1881 and supporting them with gun and rocket fire.

Wild Swan was decommissioned and placed on the list of Admiralty vessels for sale in 1900. She was withdrawn from the list and re-fitted in late 1901 as a training ship in Kingstown Harbour for men of the Royal Navy Reserve and coastguards of the North of Ireland stations. She also served as tender to HMS Melampus, coast guard ship at Kingstown.

Fate
Wild Swan became a base ship on 1 May 1904 and was renamed Clyde. She was renamed again in July 1913, becoming Columbine. She was sold for breaking to the Forth Shipbreaking company on 4 May 1920.

Notes

References

Bibliography

 

Osprey-class sloops
Ships built on the River Clyde
1876 ships
Victorian-era sloops of the United Kingdom